Olchowiec may refer to the following places:
Olchowiec, Biłgoraj County in Lublin Voivodeship (east Poland)
Olchowiec, Chełm County in Lublin Voivodeship (east Poland)
Olchowiec, Krasnystaw County in Lublin Voivodeship (east Poland)
Olchowiec, Subcarpathian Voivodeship (south-east Poland)
Olchowiec, Bieszczady County in Subcarpathian Voivodeship (south-east Poland)
Olchowiec, West Pomeranian Voivodeship (north-west Poland)